Herbert Clark (born 1896) was an English footballer who played for Rochdale when they joined the English Football League in 1921. He previously played non-league football for a number of other clubs.

References

Sheffield United F.C. players
Rochdale A.F.C. players
Linfield F.C. players
Halifax Town A.F.C. players
English footballers
Footballers from Sheffield
1896 births
20th-century deaths
Year of death missing
Association football fullbacks